Frederick John French,  (January 18, 1847 – 1924) was an Ontario lawyer and political figure. He represented Grenville South and then Grenville in the Legislative Assembly of Ontario as a Conservative member from 1879 to 1890.

He was born in Burritt's Rapids, Canada West in 1847, the son of John Strachan French, of United Empire Loyalist heritage. His great grandfather Jeremiah French served in the first parliament of Upper Canada. French studied law in Ottawa and Toronto, was called to the bar in 1870 and set up practice in Prescott, also working in Ottawa. In 1879, he married Alma Alicia Gordon, the sister of William Gordon who was mayor of Stratford. French was named Queen's Counsel in 1889.

References

External links 

The Canadian men and women of the time : a handbook of Canadian biography, HJ Morgan (1898)
The Canadian parliamentary companion and annual register, 1881, CH Mackintosh

1847 births
1924 deaths
Canadian King's Counsel
Progressive Conservative Party of Ontario MPPs